The Forty-Ninth Arkansas General Assembly was the legislative body of the state of Arkansas in 1933 and 1934. In this General Assembly, all 35 positions in the Arkansas Senate and 100 positions in the Arkansas House of Representatives were both controlled by the Democrats.

Major events
Democratic hegemony was typical in Arkansas and throughout the American South during the Solid South period.

Vacancies
 Senator John Fred Parish (D-29th) was contested, and R. A. Nelson was seated on January 9, 1933
Representative Ethel Cole Cunningham (D-Yell County) resigned at the end of the regular session but is carried as absent non-voting

Senate
The senate was completely controlled the Democratic party. Fifteen freshman senators took seats in the chamber, including John Fred Parish (D-29th), who successfully contested the reelection of incumbent R. A. Nelson, who was seated at the beginning of the session.

Leadership
 President of the Senate: Lee Cazort

Senators

House of Representatives
The House was almost entirely new, with 73 freshmen members. Only three members had first won election to the House in 1928.

Leadership
 Speaker of the House: H. K. Toney

Representatives

References

 

Arkansas legislative sessions
1933 in Arkansas
1933 U.S. legislative sessions